Cercle Athlétique Bastiais or CA Bastia was a French football club from Bastia, Corsica. The team's highest point was playing in Ligue 2, the second tier of the French football league system, in 2013–14.

Their historic home stadium was the Stade d'Erbajolo in Bastia, although they played their Ligue 2 home games in the Stade Armand Cesari, home stadium of the city's other professional team, SC Bastia.

In 2017, after suffering relegation from the 2016–17 Championnat National (third tier), they merged with Borgo FC to form FC Bastia-Borgo.

Former players

References 

 
CA Bastia
Defunct football clubs in France
Football clubs in Corsica
Association football clubs established in 1920
Association football clubs disestablished in 2017
CA Bastia
2017 disestablishments in France
Sport in Haute-Corse